Social (pragmatic) communication disorder (SPCD) - previously called semantic-pragmatic disorder (SPD) or pragmatic language impairment (PLI) - is a disorder in understanding pragmatic aspects of language. People with SPCD have special challenges with the semantic aspect of language (the meaning of what is being said) and the pragmatics of language (using language appropriately in social situations). Individuals have difficulties with verbal and nonverbal social communication. 

Relates to Pragmatic Language Impairment and Autism Spectrum Disorder. It has only been since 2013 that SPCD has become its own category in the DSM-5. In creating this new category it allowed individuals to be considered with a form of communication disorder distinct from PLI and ASD. As well, SPCD lacks behaviors associated with restrictions and repetition which are seen in ASD.

Presentation
 Issues with communication for social purposes 
 Unable to adapt communication to context
 Struggles to follow conversation and story type situation
 Unable to understand abstract ideas.

Symptoms

Individuals with social communication disorder have particular trouble understanding the meaning of what others are saying, and they are challenged in using language appropriately to get their needs met and interact with others. Children with the disorder often exhibit:

 Delayed language development
 Language disorders (similar to the acquired disorder of aphasia) such as word search pauses, jargoning, word order errors, word category errors, verb tense errors.
 Stuttering or cluttering speech
 Repeating words or phrases
 Tendency to be concrete or prefer facts to stories
 Difficulties with:
Pronouns or pronoun reversal  
 Understanding questions 
 Understanding choices and making decisions
 Following conversations or stories (conversations are "off-topic" or "one-sided")
 Extracting the key points from a conversation or story; they tend to get lost in the details
 Verb tenses
 Explaining or describing an event
 Understanding satire or jokes and contextual cues 
 Reading comprehension
 Reading body language
 Making and maintaining friendships and relationships because of delayed language development
 Distinguishing offensive remarks

According to Bishop and Norbury (2002), children with semantic pragmatic disorder can have fluent, complex and clearly articulated expressive language but exhibit problems with the way their language is used. These children typically are verbose. However, they usually have problems understanding and producing connected discourse, instead giving conversational responses that are socially inappropriate, tangential and stereotyped. They often develop eccentric interests but not as strong or obsessional as people with autism spectrum disorders.

The current view, therefore, is that the disorder has more to do with communication and information processing than language. For example, children with semantic pragmatic disorder will often fail to grasp the central meaning or saliency of events. This then leads to an excessive preference for routine and "sameness" (seen in autism spectrum disorders), as children with SCD struggle to generalize and grasp the meaning of situations that are new; it also means that more difficulties occur in a stimulating environment than in a one-to-one setting.

A further problem caused by SCD is the assumption of literal communication. This would mean that obvious, concrete instructions are clearly understood and carried out, whereas simple but non-literal expressions such as jokes, sarcasm and general social chatting are difficult and can lead to misinterpretation. Lies are also a confusing concept to children with SCD as it involves knowing what the speaker is thinking, intending and truly meaning beyond a literal interpretation.

Diagnosis
Due to the fact that the SPCD has only been categorized in the last six years, diagnosis is yet to be fully established. In the DSM-5, the child is diagnosed with SPCD if the child does not meet the criteria for other disorders such as ASD and PDD-NOS. Common assessments used to identify SPCD are:

 The developmental, dimensional and diagnostic interview (3Di) 
 The child communication checklist (CCC)
 The strengths and difficulties questionnaire (SDQ)
 Natural Observation 
 Targeted Observation of Pragmatics in Children's Conversations (TOPICC)
 Analysis of Language Impaired Children's Conversation (ALICC)
 Structured Observation 
 Test of Language Competence 
 Assessment of Comprehension and Expression (ACE 6‐11)
 Test of Pragmatic Language 
 Bus story 
 Expression, Reception and Recall of Narrative Instrument (ERRNI)

Although there are several tests that can be done to try to identify SPCD, there are some tests that are better suited to diagnose SPCD than others. As well, there is not a specific assessment or test that is able to diagnose SPCD unlike other disorders such as ASD, DLD and PLI.

The DSM-5 categorizes SPCD as a communication disorder within the domain of neurodevelopmental disorders, listed alongside other disorders of speech and language which typically manifest in early childhood. The DSM-5 diagnostic criteria for social communication disorder is as follows:
A. Persistent difficulties in the social use of verbal and nonverbal communication as manifested by all of the following:
 Deficits in using communication for social purposes, such as greeting and sharing information, in a manner that is appropriate for the social context.
 Impairment of the ability to change communication to match context or the needs of the listener, such as speaking differently in a classroom than on a playground, talking differently to a child than to an adult, and avoiding use of overly formal language.
 Difficulties following rules for conversation and storytelling, such as taking turns in conversation, rephrasing when misunderstood, and knowing how to use verbal and nonverbal signals to regulate interaction.
 Difficulties understanding what is not explicitly stated (e.g., making inferences) and nonliteral or ambiguous meanings of language (e.g., idioms, humor, metaphors, multiple meanings that depend on the context for interpretation).
B. The deficits result in functional limitations in effective communication, social participation, social relationships, academic achievement, or occupational performance, individually or in combination.
C. The onset of symptoms is in the early developmental period (but deficits may not become fully manifested until social communication demands exceed limited capacities).
D. The symptoms are not attributable to another medical or neurological condition or to low abilities in the domains of word structure and grammar, and are not better explained by autism spectrum disorder, intellectual disability (intellectual developmental disorder), global developmental delay, or another mental disorder.

Treatment

Treatments for SPCD are less established than for treatments for other disorders such as autism. Similarities between SPCD and some aspects of autism leads some researchers to try some treatments for autism with people with SCD. 

Speech therapy can help individuals who have communication disorders. Speech and language therapy treatment focuses on communication and social interaction. Speech therapists can work with clients on communication in various settings.

Similar or related disorders
Hyperlexia is a similar but different disorder where main characteristics are an above-average ability to read with a below-average ability to understand spoken or written language. Joanne Volden wrote an article in 2002 comparing the linguistic weaknesses of children with nonverbal learning disability to PLI.

Differences between SPCD and autism
Communication problems are also part of the autism spectrum disorder (autism); however, individuals with autism also show a restricted pattern of behavior, according to behavioral psychologists. The diagnosis of SPCD can only be given if autism has been ruled out. It is assumed that those with autism have difficulty with the meaning of what is being said due to different ways of responding to social situations.

Prior to the release of the DSM-5 in 2013, SPCD was not differentiated from a diagnosis of autism. However, there were a large number of cases of children experiencing difficulties with pragmatics that did not meet the criteria for autism. The differential diagnosis of SPCD allows practitioners to account for social and communication difficulties which occur to a lesser degree than in children with autism. Social communication disorder is distinguished from autism by the absence of any history (current or past) of restricted/repetitive patterns of interest or behavior in SPCD.

History
In 1983, Rapin and Allen suggested the term "semantic pragmatic disorder" to describe the communicative behavior of children who presented traits such as pathological talkativeness, deficient access to vocabulary and discourse comprehension, atypical choice of terms and inappropriate conversational skills. They referred to a group of children who presented with mild autistic features and specific semantic pragmatic language problems. In the late 1990s, the term "pragmatic language impairment" (PLI) was proposed.

Rapin and Allen's definition has been expanded and refined by therapists who include communication disorders that involve difficulty in understanding the meaning of words, grammar, syntax, prosody, eye gaze, body language, gestures, or social context. While autistic children exhibit pragmatic language impairment, this type of communication disorder can also be found in individuals with other types of disorders including auditory processing disorders, neuropathies, encephalopathies and certain genetic disorders.

Prior to the release of the DSM-5, there was debate over the relationship between semantic pragmatic disorder and autistic disorder, as the clinical profile of semantic pragmatic disorder is often seen in children with high-functioning autism. Before the DSM-5 specified SPCD as a separate diagnosis, people with SPCD symptoms were often diagnosed with pervasive developmental disorder not otherwise specified (PDD-NOS).

As mentioned in the introduction, SPCD has only been around since 2013. Before it emerged as its own disorder SPCD could have fallen into ASD, PLI, DLD, etc. The reason being because several of these disorders include an issue with social communication. In terms of developmental language disorder (DLD), individuals with this disorder have issues with language form and content and there seem to be any developmental cause. In social environments DLD seemed to have less difficulties than SPCD.

In regards to ASD, ASD behaviors normally involve repetitive behaviors which are normally not present in SPCD. It does not mean that SPCD does not show such behaviors.

PLI tends to be the disorder that is more common to SPCD than the other disorders due to the fact that both disorders are focused on the pragmatic difficulties individuals have in language with both disorders. SPCD has an element of social communication that is lacking or undeveloped, unlike PLI.

In terms of Specific language impairment, there tends to a lot of similarities to SCPD and PLI but SLI deals with Semantic-Pragmatic issues. This means that there are several issues that fall into Semantic- Pragmatic issues such as uncommon word choice, speaking to oneself out loud and interesting, unimpaired phonology and syntax.

See also 
 Alexithymia
 Asperger syndrome
 Attention deficit hyperactivity disorder (ADHD)
 Autism
 High-functioning autism
 Hyperlexia
 Nonverbal learning disorder 
 PDD not otherwise specified

References

Autism
Communication disorders
Language disorders
Learning disabilities